The 2018–19 Greek A2 Basket League was the 33rd season of the Greek A2 Basket League, the second-tier level professional club basketball league in Greece. It was the fourth season with the participation of 16 teams. Playoff and play out games were also held, for a fourth consecutive season. Ionikos Nikaias clinched the championship by winning the regular season. Along with the playoffs winners Iraklis, they were automatically promoted to the 2019–20 Greek Basket League.

Teams

Regular season

Promotion playoffs

Relegation playoffs

See also
2018–19 Greek Basketball Cup
2018–19 Greek Basket League (1st tier)

References

External links
Greek A2 Basketball League
Hellenic Basketball Federation 

Greek A2 Basket League
Greek
2018–19 in Greek basketball